The Carlstadt Public Schools is a community public school district that serves students in pre-kindergarten through eighth grade from the Borough of Carlstadt in Bergen County, New Jersey, United States.

As of the 2018–19 school year, the district, comprised of one school, had an enrollment of 562 students and 45.0 classroom teachers (on an FTE basis), for a student–teacher ratio of 12.5:1.

The district is classified by the New Jersey Department of Education as being in District Factor Group "DE", the fifth-highest of eight groupings. District Factor Groups organize districts statewide to allow comparison by common socioeconomic characteristics of the local districts. From lowest socioeconomic status to highest, the categories are A, B, CD, DE, FG, GH, I and J.
 
A groundbreaking ceremony for a new elementary / middle school was held on June 4, 2005, at the site of the new school, adjacent to the Lindbergh School. With the opening of the new Carlstadt Public School, which now serves all of Carlstadt's K-8 students, the Lincoln and Washington school sites have been turned over to the borough and plans have been developed to convert the sites for senior housing.

For ninth through twelfth grades, public school students attend the Henry P. Becton Regional High School in East Rutherford, which serves high school students from both Carlstadt and East Rutherford as part of the Carlstadt-East Rutherford Regional School District. As of the 2018–19 school year, the high school had an enrollment of 491 students and 37.2 classroom teachers (on an FTE basis), for a student–teacher ratio of 13.2:1.

Schools 
Carlstadt Public School serves students in grades Pre-K to 8. The school had an enrollment of 549 students as of the 2018–19 school year (based on enrollment data from the National Center for Education Statistics).
Kenneth Foy, Principal

Administration 
Core members of the district's administration are:
Stephen M. Kollinok, Superintendent
Megan Pepe, Business Administrator / Board Secretary

Board of education
The district's board of education, comprised of nine members, sets policy and oversees the fiscal and educational operation of the district through its administration. As a Type II school district, the board's trustees are elected directly by voters to serve three-year terms of office on a staggered basis, with three seats up for election each year held (since 2012) as part of the November general election. The board appoints a superintendent to oversee the day-to-day operation of the district.

References

External links 
Carlstadt Public Schools

School Data for the Carlstadt Public Schools, National Center for Education Statistics
Carlstadt-East Rutherford Regional School District

Carlstadt, New Jersey
New Jersey District Factor Group DE
School districts in Bergen County, New Jersey